The Kerala Legislative Assembly, popularly known as the Niyamasabha (literally Hall of laws), is the law making body of Kerala, one of the 29 States in India. The Assembly is formed by 140 elected representatives and one nominated member from the Anglo-Indian community. Each elected member represents one of the 140 constituencies within the borders of Kerala and is referred to as Member of Legislative Assembly (MLA).

Composition
This Legislature assembly was the 13th Assembly, since formation of Kerala. Speaker post fell vacant due to the death of Shri G. Karthikeyan on 7 March 2015 and Shri N Sakhthan is the Deputy Speaker. The leader of the Assembly is Oommen Chandy, who is also Congress Legislative Party leader, whereas V.S. Achuthanandan is the Leader of the opposition.

Political parties or coalitions

Members of Legislative Assembly of Kerala

Speakers of the Kerala Legislative Assembly

See also
 Kerala Legislative Assembly election, 2011

References

 Legislators up to 2006
 http://klaproceedings.niyamasabha.org

External links

 niyamasabha.org
 Kerala Assembly Election 2016 Website
 Election Database
 klaproceedings.niyamasabha.org

2011 establishments in India
Kerala MLAs 2011–2016